is a  Japanese role-playing video game developed by Tokyo RPG Factory and published by Square Enix. The game is the second to be developed by Tokyo RPG Factory, and considered a spiritual successor to their first title, I Am Setsuna. It was released for Nintendo Switch, PlayStation 4, and Microsoft Windows in Japan in October 2017, and worldwide in January 2018.

Gameplay
Lost Sphear plays as a spiritual successor to I Am Setsuna, which in itself was created to emulate the style of 1990's JRPGs. The game features a retooled variant of the Active Time Battle system found in I Am Setsuna, Chrono Trigger, and older Final Fantasy titles.

Synopsis
Lost Sphear takes place on an unnamed world where its Moon is treated as its creator. The opening scene shows Oboro, a king of the ancient Plated People, watching his soldiers and world vanishing into nothing. An unspecified time later, the young Kanata, together with his friends Lumina and Locke, explore the land outside their village home of Elgarthe, encountering a rise in monsters. Returning to Elgarthe, they find it transformed into a white void called "Lost". Using the memories of prayers from the villagers to a local alter, Kanata unlocks a power to restore the town, and upon learning that other parts of the world are also becoming Lost, he resolves to save the Lost using his powers. He is initially employed by the powerful Gigante Empire, but upon learning their lack of ethical methods and the fact that their actions are worsening the problem, he defects and sets out on his own.

During his journey, Kanata's group is joined by Van, crown prince of a land revealed to be suffering from a similar plight to Elgarthe; Oboro, whom Kanata rescues from being Lost; Shera, War Maiden of the Twilighters tribe who oppose the Empire's use of a fuel source native to their lands; Dianto, a sentient monster born from the prayers of the village of Salny; and Galdra, female Commander of the Imperial forces and a close ally before joining. During an early mission from the Empire to acquire Vulcosuits, Locke is severely injured by a trap, and is secretly turned into a mechanical soldier who initially fights the party before regaining his memories and rejoining them. Van briefly betrays the group after Kanata fails to restore his kingdom, but is in turn betrayed by his former ally Krom, a figure with strange powers who has been influencing the Empire's actions. It is revealed that the Moon is a techno-magical system which is striving to create a world free of conflict, destroying each version of the world and recreating it when whenever conflict begins. During an earlier cycle, Krom was a researcher who helped steal the Moon's power and merged with it in an attempt to recreate a world free of its influence. The current crisis is Krom beginning his attempt to remake the world, mirroring the Moon's earlier actions.

After initially defeating Krom, the group are forced into the realm of the Lost, but escape and learn that both Kanata and Lumina were born directly from the Moon, able to harness its powers. Returning to the world, they rally their allies and discover a way to reach the moon and defeat Krom, who has permanently merged with the Moon. With Krom's defeat, the Moon begins to disintegrate, and after the others flee, Kanata and Lumina unsuccessfully attempt to restore the Moon. Lumina decides to sacrifice herself by merging back into the Moon. Kanata can choose to either allow this, or use his powers to rescue her. If Lumina sacrifices herself, the Moon is restored and leaves Kanata to restore the world and create a future ruled by humans. If Kanata saves Lumina, the Moon's destruction is halted, but the Lost remain a growing threat, and Kanata ponders if he doomed the world but resolves to continue giving hope to the world by restoring the Lost. The game ends with a shot of the cast, including Lumina depending on the final choice, gazing up at the completed Moon shining on an intact landscape.

Development and release
In 2014, Square Enix formed a new development studio named "Tokyo Dream Factory". Square Enix appointed Atsushi Hashimoto to lead the company due to his views aligning with their goal for the company, namely creating modern JRPGs similar to those developed in the 1990s, such as Chrono Trigger and Final Fantasy. The company's first game, I Am Setsuna, was released in 2016, and was successful enough to warrant developing a second title. The follow up, Lost Sphear, was officially revealed on May 30, 2017, being announced for the Nintendo Switch, PlayStation 4, and Microsoft Windows platforms, dropping Setsuna's PlayStation Vita platform. A demo of the game was made playable at PAX West, and was made downloadable in Japan a month before its release. The game was released in Japan on October 12, 2017, and worldwide on January 23, 2018.

The game had a physical release in a limited capacity outside of Japan for the PlayStation 4 and Switch. The game's soundtrack was written by Tomoki Miyoshi, who previously worked on the music for I Am Setsuna.

Reception and sales

The game's initial Japanese release far undersold the numbers of its predecessor I Am Setsuna; while I Am Setsuna sold a combined 61,623 copies between 33,629 on PS4 and 27,994 on Vita, while Lost Sphear sold only 7,363 on PS4, and 5,770 on Switch. Dengeki stated that the game only sold about 20% of its initial shipment, indicating that Square Enix likely expected it to sell more as well. During its fiscal year ending March 2018, Square Enix noted Tokyo RPG Factory had achieved a profit of ¥83 million, down over 60% from their profits the previous year following the release of I Am Setsuna.

Both the PS4 and Switch versions of Lost Sphear received 32/40 review scores from Famitsu. PCGamesN praised the game for being similar to Chrono Trigger, concluding "It is so familiar, and so well executed, it can’t help but bring you joy...But it is not all nostalgia, and in fact, when it comes down to the brass tacks of gameplay, it is the freshest RPG I have played in some time."

References

Notes

External links

2017 video games
Nintendo Switch games
PlayStation 4 games
Japanese role-playing video games
Role-playing video games
Single-player video games
Square Enix games
Video games developed in Japan
Windows games